Estádio Olímpico Colosso da Lagoa is a multi-use stadium in Erechim, Brazil. It is currently used mostly for football matches. The stadium holds 22,000. It was built in 1970.

The stadium is owned by Ypiranga Futebol Clube. The stadium is named after the Lagoa Vermelha (meaning Red Lake), which is located near the stadium.

History

In 1970, the works on Colosso da Lagoa were completed. The inaugural match was played on September 2 of that year, when Santos beat Grêmio 2–0. The first goal of the stadium was scored by Santos' Pelé, who received a trophy awarded by Rádio Tupi after the match.

The stadium's attendance record currently stands at 25,000, set on August 18, 1974 when Internacional beat Ypiranga 2–0.

References
Enciclopédia do Futebol Brasileiro, Volume 2 - Lance, Rio de Janeiro: Aretê Editorial S/A, 2001.

External links
Templos do Futebol

Football venues in Rio Grande do Sul
Ypiranga Futebol Clube